Piskorzówek  is a village in the administrative district of Gmina Domaniów, within Oława County, Lower Silesian Voivodeship, in southwestern Poland.

The name Piskorzówek is a diminutive form of the name of the nearby village of Piskorzów, which in turn comes from the Polish word piskorz, which means "weatherfish".

Transport
The Polish A4 motorway runs nearby, north-east of the village.

References

Villages in Oława County